Ebrahim Kandi-ye Vosta  (also Romanized as Ebrāhīm Kandī-ye Vosţá; also known as Ebrāhīm Kandī-ye Shomāreh-ye Do) is a village in Qeshlaq-e Shomali Rural District, in the Central District of Parsabad County, Ardabil Province, Iran. At the 2006 census, its population was 30, in 6 families.

References 

Towns and villages in Parsabad County